The following is a list of Registered Historic Places in Huron County, Michigan.



Current listings

|}

See also

 List of Michigan State Historic Sites in Huron County, Michigan
 List of National Historic Landmarks in Michigan
 National Register of Historic Places listings in Michigan
 Listings in neighboring counties: Sanilac, Tuscola

References

Huron County
Huron County, Michigan
Buildings and structures in Huron County, Michigan